A Death-Grip on Yesterday is the third studio album by American metalcore band Atreyu. It was released on March 28, 2006, through Victory Records. A week after its release, it had sold more than 69,000 copies and started out at #9 on the Billboard 200. It has gone on to sell more than 340,000 copies.

The album was released with a Victory Records DVD featuring the making of the album and promotional videos by Victory Records artists.

An instrumental version of the album, as well as The Curse, was released on iTunes on January 9, 2007.

Track listing

Song appearances
The censored version of the song "Ex's and Oh's" is featured in EA Sports' Madden NFL 07 video game.
The song "Ex's and Oh's" is also part of a downloadable track pack for Guitar Hero II on the Xbox 360.
"Shameful" was played during the TNA 2006 recap at the end of the December 28, 2006 edition of TNA iMPACT!. It was also used in the TNA Sacrifice replay video.
The song "My Fork in the Road" was used on The Hills Have Eyes 2 soundtrack.
The song "My Fork in the Road" was used for a recap video of 2007 edition of TNA Lockdown.
A sample of "My Fork in the Road (Your Knife in My Back)" was also used to recap the results of a vehicle modification on the MTV2 show Pimp My Ride.
The songs "Ex's and Oh's" and "Our Sick Story (Thus Far)" were briefly played on MTV's Jersey Shore.
A sample of "We Stand Up" was on Rob Dyrdek's Fantasy Factory during the zip lining scene.

Personnel

Band line-up
Alex Varkatzas – lead vocals
Dan Jacobs – lead guitar
Travis Miguel – rhythm guitar
Marc McKnight – bass
Brandon Saller – drums, percussion, clean vocals, additional guitar, keyboards, programming

Additional credits
Alex Varkatzas – lyrics
Jeff Gros – photography
Brian Warwick – assistant mixing
Ted Jensen – mastering
Josh Abraham – production
Ryan Williams – engineering, mixing
Scott Adair – management 
Atreyu – production
Don Clark – artwork, layout design  
Tim Smith – management

Charts
Album - Billboard (North America)

Singles - Billboard (United States)

References

Atreyu (band) albums
2006 albums
Victory Records albums
Albums produced by Josh Abraham